David Foley (born 1987) is an English professional footballer.

David Foley may also refer to:
David Edward Foley (1930–2018), American Roman Catholic prelate
Dave Foley (born 1963), Canadian actor
Dave Foley (American football) (born 1947), American football player during the 1960s and 1970s
Dave Foley (rugby union) (born 1988), Irish rugby union player